Deadly Cuts is a 2021 Irish comedy film directed and written by Rachel Carey.

Production
Deadly Cuts was filmed on location in Finglas.

Plot
North Dublin hairdressers Deadly Cuts must fight for its survival against both a local protection racket and then a greedy developer; they then enter a televised hairdressing competition.

Release
Deadly Cuts was the most successful Irish film at the box office for 2021.

Reception
Rotten Tomatoes reported an approval rating of 94% based on 17 reviews. The Irish Times gave it 3 stars out of 5, criticising the broad comedy, which they compared negatively with Mrs. Brown's Boys, but praising the performances of Victoria Smurfit and Pauline McLynn. The Guardian gave it 2 out of 5, referring to the "Ortonesque" murder plot, but saying the film was "more silly than funny."

It was nominated for five Irish Film and Television Awards, winning one (Best Costume Design for Kathy Strachan).

Awards and nominations

References

External links

2021 films
2021 comedy films
English-language Irish films
2020s English-language films
Films shot in Dublin (city)
Films set in Dublin (city)
Films about hairdressers
Films about the working class
Films about competitions